Belaire High School  (usually abbreviated as "Belaire" or BHS) is a public school in East Baton Rouge Parish. It is located in Baton Rouge, Louisiana. The school is a part of the East Baton Rouge Parish Public Schools.

History
Belaire was founded in 1974. The first principal of Belaire High School was Thomas Holliman. A group of students from all over the Baton Rouge community helped define the school colors (burnt orange, royal blue, and white), and the school mascot. Today, they are still known to be the Belaire Bengals. The first school year started in August 1974 and "Bengal Land" was born. Throughout the course of the school year, numerous events are held in honor of the Bengal and its Indian background. Events such as the festival of Dwali or "Festival of Light", and school fixtures such as the Bengal Lancer Band, The Kannada Review (school newspaper), The Veda (school yearbook) all are representative of the school's pride and heritage. Belaire High School.

Communities served
elaire serves sections of Baton Rouge and the Monticello census-designated place.

At one time it served a section of Central before the city started its own school district.

Feeder patterns
The following elementary schools feed into Belaire:
 Glen Oaks Park
 Greenbrier
 La Belle Aire
 Lanier
 Park Forest
 Riveroaks
 Villa del Rey
 Broadmoor (partial)
 Howell Park (partial)
 Sharon Hills (partial)
 Twin Oaks (partial)
 Red Oaks
The following middle schools feed into Belaire:
 Broadmoor
 Park Forest
 Southeast
 Glen Oaks (partial)
 Sherwood Middle

Athletics
Belaire High athletics competes in the LHSAA.

Notable alumni

Brad Davis - college football coach 
 Robert Ellis - MLB pitcher
Michael Jackson, former Louisiana State Representative
 Mewelde Moore - NFL player
 Marcus Spears - NFL player
 Webbie - Rapper

References

External links
 Belaire High School Web Site
 Belaire High School Class of 1983 Web Site

Schools in Baton Rouge, Louisiana
Public high schools in Louisiana
1974 establishments in Louisiana
Educational institutions established in 1974